Arsenalna is a station on Kyiv Metro’s Sviatoshynsko-Brovarska Line. The station was opened along with the first stage and is currently the second deepest station in the world at  after Hongyancun station of the Chongqing Metro system. This is attributed to Kyiv’s geography, where the high bank of the Dnieper River rises above the rest of the city. Also unusual is the station’s design, which lacks a central concourse and is thus similar in layout to stations on the London Underground.

Since 1986, the station has the status of "architectural monument of local significance", protection number 187.

Station

Although Arsenalna (architects G. Granatkin, S. Krushynsky, N. Shchukina) appears as a pylon trivault, the “Pylons”, along with their portals, are all purely cosmetic decorations. Pink marble walls with bronze grills (that feature metallic artwork on Soviet themes, Soviet stars are due to be removed due to 2015 decommunization laws) is all that is present in the portal. Instead, the station has a small lobby connected directly to the escalator tunnel.

The two-step escalator of Arsenalna station is the deepest descent in Kyiv - 55.8 + 46.6 m. It is the oldest in the Kyiv metro. The ride on the escalators itself is one of the longest, totaling up to five minutes.

There are reasons for the layout of the stations, as the cosmetic pylons were planned to be real. The main one comes from the tough soils of the location and the problems with hydroisolation, which forced the builders to conserve the design. Similar problems happened on the first stage in Moscow, however later the stations Lubyanka and Chistye Prudy were completed. In Kyiv, this never was to happen. Originally built as an interim on a long track before the line crossed the Dnieper and continued into the left bank residential districts, and with the Kyiv Arsenal Factory, for which the station was named, being the only human source of passengers, it was never to have large passenger traffic to justify a complex and costly reconstruction. Nor was the station ever planned to be a transfer point (unlike the Moscow stations, which ultimately was the reason for them to be rebuilt). However, as the historic Arsenal Factory is now home to the Mystetskyi Arsenal Museum, the station could be reconstructed to accommodate visitors to the Museum.

Decoratively, apart from the spoken portals, the station is monochromatic in its appearance. The plastered vault ceilings, ceramic tiled walls and the marbled “pylons” all are of white colour. A large sculptural artwork depicting revolutionary events that took place in the Arsenal factory in 1918 graced the wall of the main lobby hall until it was removed in the early 1990s.

The station's large surface vestibule is situated on the square leading onto Ivana Mazepy, Dmytro Godzenko, and Mykhailo Hrushevsky streets. Behind the station is a service bay that is used for nighttime stands and minor repairs to the railcar park.

The station went into reconstruction in 2020 and was opened partly in 2021. The complete reconstruction and restoration of nearby historical buildings were finished in August 2021 and the station was opened on 2 September 2021.

During the 2022 Russian invasion of Ukraine, the station was used as a bomb shelter.

Opening hours 
The first train departing to:

st. Lisova - 06:01 am

st. "Akademmistechko" - 05:48 am

Directions for the last train:

st. "Lisova" - 12:30 am

st. "Akademmistechko" - 12:18 am

Train departure schedule at the evening hours (after 10:00 pm.):

St. "Lisova" - 22:57, 11:09 pm, 11:21 pm, 11:32 pm, 11:44 pm, 11:55 pm, 12:07am, 12:18 am, 12:30 am

St. "Akademmistechko" - 10:25 pm, 10:37 pm, 10:49 pm, 10:59 pm, 10:10 pm, 11:20 pm, 11:30 pm, 11:40 pm, 11:52 pm, 12:05 am, 12:18 am

References

External links 
 Kyivsky Metropoliten – Station description and Photographs 
 Zarohem.cz – Photographs 

Kyiv Metro stations
Railway stations opened in 1960
1960 establishments in Ukraine